Al-Zaylai (Abd al-Raḥman bin Aḥmad al-Zaylai ) ( 1820–1882) was a Somali scholar who played a crucial role in the spread of the Qadiriyyah Sufi order in Somalia and East Africa.

Born in the rural village of Kedilai northwest of Mogadishu, he studied elementary ilm under the supervision of the local Ulema,
He later moved to Mogadishu, studying under Sheikh Isma'il b. Umar al-Maqdishi.

Al-Zayla'i traveled to various Islamic centers in the Horn of Africa. Upon returning to his home village, he established a community of pupils near  Qolonqol, setting out to spread the Qadiriyyah order throughout the upper Shebelle region. This enhanced his reputation and also helped the order gain considerable success amongst the region's pastoralists, the religious elite, and the villagers of the interior.

See also
Uways al-Barawi
Zeila

References 

1820 births
1880 deaths
Somalian religious leaders
19th-century Somalian people
Somalian Sunni Muslim scholars of Islam
Ethnic Somali people